Eucalyptus grossa, commonly known as coarse-leaved mallee, is a species of mallee or rarely a straggly tree, that is endemic to Western Australia. It has rough, fibrous bark on the trunk and all but the thinnest branches, broadly lance-shaped to egg-shaped adult leaves, flower buds in groups of seven, yellowish green flowers and cup-shaped to cylindrical fruit.

Description
It has rough, fibrous, grey to brownish bark on the trunk and branches. Flowering occurs mainly from August to November and the flowers are yellowish green.

Taxonomy and naming
Eucalyptus grossa was first formally described in 1867 by George Bentham in Flora Australiensis from an unpublished description by Ferdinand von Mueller. The type collection was made by George Maxwell near the Phillips River and its tributaries. The specific epithet (grossa) is from the Latin grossus, meaning 'thick' or 'coarse', referring to the leaves, buds and fruit.

Distribution and habitat
Coarse-leaved mallee grows around granite rocks and in thickets on flat and slightly undulating ground from near Newdegate to the south and east of Norseman in the Coolgardie, Esperance Plains and Mallee biogeographic regions.

Taxonomy
The species was first formally described by botanist George Bentham in 1867.

Conservation status
This eucalypt is classified as "not threatened" by the Western Australian Government Department of Parks and Wildlife.

Uses

Use in horticulture
This species has ornamental flowers and can be maintained as a dense, compact shrub if regular pruning is undertaken. It has proved adaptable to a wide range of conditions in temperate areas in Australia.

Cultural references
The coarse-leaved mallee appeared on a 50 cent Australian postage stamp in 2005.

See also
List of Eucalyptus species
List of flora on stamps of Australia

References

Eucalypts of Western Australia
grossa
Myrtales of Australia
Mallees (habit)
Plants described in 1867
Taxa named by Ferdinand von Mueller
Taxa named by George Bentham